The Rodope montane mixed forests is a terrestrial ecoregion of Europe defined by the WWF. It belongs in the temperate broadleaf and mixed forests biome and the Palearctic realm.

Geography
The Rodope montane mixed forests cover the higher parts of the Balkan Mountains, the Rhodope Mountains, Rila, Pirin, Vitosha, Sredna Gora, Ograzhden and Maleshevo, situated almost entirely in Bulgaria, as well as in some adjacent areas in Greece, North Macedonia and Serbia. They span an area of 31,600 km2 and are replaced at lower altitudes by the Balkan mixed forests.

Flora
The number of species of vascular plants in the ecoregion are estimated at 3,000. The lower areas are covered with mixed deciduous woods, most prominently with European beech, Oriental hornbeam, European hornbeam and several oak species. The higher zones are dominated by coniferous forests — Scots pine, Bosnian pine, Macedonian pine, Bulgarian fir, Silver fir, Norway spruce, etc. The highest altitudes support shrubs, heath and Alpine tundra.

Fauna
The Rodope montane mixed forests are sanctuary to a number of endangered mammal species, such as brown bears, wolves, European pine martens, European otters, wildcats and chamois. More common large mammals include roe deer, wild boars and foxes.

Most of the European birds of prey can be found in the region, including the rare Eastern imperial eagle, cinereous vulture and griffon vulture.

Protected areas
The Rodope montane mixed forests ecoregion holds a total of three national parks, all of them situated in Bulgaria, and they comprise the Central Balkan National Park, Pirin National Park, a UNESCO World Heritage Site, and Rila National Park.

See also 
List of ecoregions in Bulgaria

External links

References

Rhodope Mountains
Ecoregions of Bulgaria
Ecoregions of Greece
Ecoregions of North Macedonia
Ecoregions of Serbia
Ecoregions of Europe

Environment of the Balkans
Balkan mountains
Montane forests
Pirin
Rila
Vitosha
Palearctic ecoregions
Temperate broadleaf and mixed forests
Forests of Bulgaria